Desprez or des Prez is a surname, and may refer to:

People
 Florian Desprez, aka Julian Florian Félix Desprez (1807–1895), French bishop and cardinal 
 Frank Desprez (1853–1916), English playwright, essayist, and poet
 Josquin des Prez ( 1450/1455 – 1521), Renaissance composer from the Low Countries
 Louis Desprez (1799–1870), French sculptor
 Louis Jean Desprez ( 1743–1804), French painter and architect
 Jean Desprez (aka Laurette Larocque, 1906–1965), French-Canadian writer and journalist
 Desprez (actor) (1759–1829), French actor

Toponyms
 Desprez Lake, a lake in Quebec, Canada
 Despréz (crater), a crater on Mercury

See also
 Despres, also Després, Desprès, des Prés, Des Pres; French surname
French toponymic surnames